These are the official results of the Men's 50 km Walk event at the 1991 World Championships held on Saturday August 31, 1991, in Tokyo, Japan, with the start at 07:00h local time. There were a total number of 38 participating athletes.

Medalists

Abbreviations
All times shown are in hours:minutes:seconds

Intermediates

Final

See also
 1990 Men's European Championships 50km Walk (Split)
 1992 Men's Olympic 50km Walk (Barcelona)
 1993 Men's World Championships 50km Walk (Stuttgart)

References
 Results

W
Racewalking at the World Athletics Championships